Aline Mosby (July 7, 1922 – August 7, 1998) was an American journalist.

Mosby mostly wrote for United Press International. She was the first American woman correspondent assigned by a major news service to the Moscow Kremlin and later Beijing. While in the Soviet Union, she met and interviewed Lee Harvey Oswald in 1959, four years before he assassinated U.S. President John F. Kennedy. Mosby was also the first journalist to report on the Marilyn Monroe nude calendar.

Early life
Mosby was born in Missoula, Montana. She earned a journalism degree at the University of Montana.

Career
Mosby worked as editor for a college issue of Madamoiselle before she joined United Press in Seattle in 1943. She moved to the Los Angeles bureau office in the 1950s, working as a radio news writer and feature writer during United Nations meetings in San Francisco. She was also a special Hollywood correspondent for six years. She famously covered a nudist convention in San Bernardino County. She was also one of the first to interview Marilyn Monroe after nude photos she had posed for in 1949 were published as a calendar. Mosby is regarded by news historians as helping Monroe become a more-notable star. She wrote anonymously for gossip magazine Confidential.

She temporarily resigned from the UP in Los Angeles and moved to Europe, signing with the London UP office shortly afterwards. From there, she was assigned to work Paris and then became the first American woman correspondent assigned to Moscow. In 1959, she interviewed Lee Harvey Oswald, who had exiled himself there. He spoke to her about his upbringing and support of Marxist socialism. She also interviewed downed U-2 pilot Francis Gary Powers. In 1962, she wrote a book titled The View from No. 13 People's Street detailing her experiences in Moscow. FBI documents identify her as a suspected Soviet agent. She was based in Washington, D.C. in 1967. She opened the UPI bureau in Beijing in 1972.

Retirement
Mosby retired from United Press International in 1984 and continued to freelance for various publications, including The New York Times.

Death
Mosby died August 7, 1998 of a cerebral hemorrhage at Palomar Medical Center in Escondido, California. She was survived by her sister, Mary Jane Bader.

References

External links
 

1922 births
1998 deaths
20th-century American journalists
American reporters and correspondents
University of Montana alumni
American women journalists
Writers from Missoula, Montana
20th-century American women
American expatriates in England
American expatriates in France
American expatriates in the Soviet Union
American expatriates in China